Kristie Ahn was the defending champion but lost in the first round to Barbara Haas.

Taylor Townsend won the title after defeating Mariana Duque Mariño 6–2, 2–6, 6–1 in the final.

Seeds

Draw

Finals

Top half

Bottom half

References
Main Draw

Hardee's Pro Classic - Singles
Hardee's Pro Classic